"I Can Only Disappoint U" is a song by the English alternative rock band Mansun. The song was written by band-leader Paul Draper with lead guitarist Dominic Chad. It was recorded and produced by Hugh Padgham and co-producer Michael Hunter during sessions for the group's third studio album. The song was released as the first single in 2000 from the group's third album, Little Kix. The song went on to become their fourth and final top ten hit in the UK peaking at #8. A Progressive house/trance remix by Paul Oakenfold preceded the release of the single during the summer of 2000.

In 2004, Mansun released a demo recording of the song on the compilation album Kleptomania. The demo was recorded by Paul Draper alone with guitar overdubs by Dominic Chad.

In 2013, Dev Hynes recording under his Blood Orange name recorded a cover of the song. The song was retitled "Always Let U Down" and released on his second studio album Cupid Deluxe.

Track listing

Personnel

Mansun
 Dominic Chad – electric guitar, backing vocals, piano, lead vocals ("Golden Stone").
 Paul Draper – lead vocals, acoustic guitar, keyboards
 Andie Rathbone – drums, percussion
 Stove – bass

Production
 Hugh Padgham – producer ("I Can Only Disappoint U", "Decisions, Decisions", "Repair Man"), Mixing ("Decisions, Decisions")
 Mike Hunter - producer ("Repair Man", "My Idea Of Fun", "Golden Stone"), co-producer ("I Can Only Disappoint U", "Decisions, Decisions", "Repair Man"), mixing ("Repair Man", "My Idea Of Fun", "Golden Stone"), engineer ("My Idea Of Fun", "Golden Stone")
 Mark 'Spike' Stent – mixing ("I Can Only Disappoint U")
 Anne Dudley - strings ("Decisions, Decisions")
 Anton Corbijn – photography
 Alex Hutchinson - design

Chart positions

References

2000 singles
2000 songs
Mansun songs
Songs written by Paul Draper (musician)
Song recordings produced by Hugh Padgham
Parlophone singles